Lekamaña is a hamlet and council located in the municipality of Amurrio, in Álava province, Basque Country, Spain. As of 2020, it has a population of 40.

Geography 
Lekamaña is located 41 km northwest of Vitoria-Gasteiz.

References

Populated places in Álava